Doctor Cha is an upcoming South Korean television series starring Uhm Jung-hwa in the title role, along with Kim Byung-chul, Myung Se-bin, and Min Woo-hyuk. It is scheduled to premiere on JTBC on April 15, 2023, and will air every Saturday and Sunday at 22:30 (KST).

Synopsis
The series follows the story of Cha Jung-sook, a housewife of twenty years who becomes a first-year medical resident.

Cast

Main
 Uhm Jung-hwa as Cha Jung-sook: a full-time housewife of twenty years who decides to return to her career as a doctor after surviving an unexpected crisis.
 Kim Byung-chul as Seo In-ho: the perfectionist husband of Jung-sook who is the chief surgeon at a university hospital.
 Myung Se-bin as Choi Seung-hee: In-ho's first love who is a family medicine professor.
 Min Woo-hyuk as Roy Kim: a charismatic surgeon who gets entangled with Jung-sook.

Supporting
 Jo Eun-yoo as Hwang Mi-ra: a surgeon at a university hospital.
 Kim Ye-eun as Min Chae-yoon: an intern in the family medicine department.
 Song Ji-ho as Seo Jung-min: Jung-sook and In-ho's son who is a first-year surgical resident.
 Moon Ye-jin

Release
It was reported that Doctor Cha was initially scheduled for release in October 2022. However, in November 2022, JTBC announced that the series was included in their 2023 drama lineup.

References

External links
  
 
 

Korean-language television shows
JTBC television dramas
Television series by Next Entertainment World
Television series by JTBC Studios
South Korean medical television series
South Korean comedy television series
2023 South Korean television series debuts

Upcoming television series